Rock and Rye is a term (both generically and brand names) for a bottled liqueur or mixed cocktail composed of rye whiskey and rock candy (crystallized sugar) or fruit.

As early as 1914, United States government publications discuss disputes regarding beverages labeled "rock and rye", including a case of a beverage so marketed which was found by the Bureau of Chemistry to consist of "water, sugar, glucose, and artificial coloring matters, sold in imitation of a rock and rye cordial".

Among non-alcoholic beverages, Rock and Rye continues to be a popular flavor of the Faygo brand of soda pop.

Related products mentioned in the early 20th century include Rock and Rum and Rock and Gin.

Slow & Low produced by Hochstadter's since 1884 produces a Rock & Rye drink that according to the label is "served straight and as a proper old-fashioned since the 1800's Rock and Rye Union Made with Straight rye Whiskey Raw Honey, Navel Orange, Rock Candy and Bitters." It is 84 Proof Produced by Hochstadter's from Scobyville, NJ.

In media

In the film National Lampoon's Animal House, Boon (Peter Riegert) orders a "double Rock and Rye and seven “Carlings" at a bar.

Mississippi Half Step Uptown Toodeloo by The Grateful Dead, lyrics by Robert Hunter references Rock and Rye in the lyrics. “Half a cup of rock and rye /Farewell to you old southern sky / I'm on my way”

Rock and Rye has long been supposed to be a cure for various types of cold and flu. Damon Runyon mentions the belief in one of his tales of Prohibition New York, “The Three Wise Guys”:

References

Liqueurs
Sugar
Cocktails with whisky